Salmabad is a town in the center of Bahrain Island.

Many businesses and factories are located in the Salmabad area. It has been developed as an industrial area in Bahrain.

References 

Populated places in the Northern Governorate, Bahrain